The Sugar River is a tributary of the Pecatonica River, approximately  long, in the U.S. states of Wisconsin and Illinois.

Geography
The headwaters are at the southern terminus of the last North American glacier. West of the river, the land elevates from lack of glaciation and joins the Driftless Area, known for its abrupt hills and valleys, covering most of southwest Wisconsin. From its source, the river meanders southeast, past Paoli and Belleville, where it is dammed to form Lake Belle View. From there it meanders east of Monticello where it is joined by the Little Sugar River and flows south through Albany, and Brodhead. It crosses into northern Illinois flowing past an extensive area of the Forest Preserves of Winnebago County system. These preserves are Sugar River Alder, Colored Sands, and Sugar River.

The Sugar River State Trail is a  abandoned railroad line used for walking, bicycling, snowmobiling, and cross-country skiing.

Four organizations have been established to protect the watershed around the upper and lower stretches of the Sugar River. The Upper Sugar River Watershed Association manages the watershed north of Belleville and the Lower Sugar River Watershed Association manages the watershed south of Albany. The area in between, the Middle Sugar River Watershed, is managed by Lake Winnetka Sugar River Improvement Association and the Green County River Rats from Attica through Albany.

Activities
The river is a popular destination for kayakers, canoers, and tubers, with multiple companies existing that rent tubes and provide transportation to customers desiring to float the river. Accidents and drowning deaths have occurred on the river; some as the result of excessive drinking, high current, or a combination of both.

See also
List of rivers of Illinois
List of rivers of Wisconsin

References

External links
 

Rivers of Illinois
Rivers of Wisconsin
Rivers of Winnebago County, Illinois
Rivers of Dane County, Wisconsin
Rivers of Green County, Wisconsin